Hieroglyphus banian is a species of grasshopper in the family Acrididae. It is a pest of millets such as sorghum, pearl millet, and finger millet in India.

References

Acrididae
Insect pests of millets